Filippo Scannabecchi (1352 – c. 1410), known as Lippo di Dalmasio, was an Italian painter from Bologna, a son of  Dalmasio Scannabecchi.

Biography
His father was Dalmasio Scannabecchi (sometimes referred to as pseudo-Dalmasio), a Bolognese painter from a minor noble family who migrated to Pistoia during a period of Guelph rule in Bologna. Lippo presumably trained both with his father and his paternal uncle Simone dei Crocefissi.  While still a boy he was accompanied to Pistoia by his uncle.  Recorded as a Bolognese citizen resident in Pistoia in 1377 (and present in both Bologna and Pistoia in 1385) he eventually returned to Bologna in 1389. Part of the school of Vitale da Bologna, he was also influenced by Tuscan artists such as Andrea di Cione (Orcagna) and his brothers Jacopo and Nardo. Between  1391 and 1410 he painted many depictions of the Virgin and Child, some of which are signed. These led to him being nicknamed in the 16th century  Lippo delle Madonne, and he is among the early Bolognese painters mentioned by Carlo Cesare Malvasia in Felsina Pittrice (1678).

Name confusion
The name 'Muratori', by which one or two writers have styled him, really belongs to Teresa Scannabecchi, a seventeenth-century female painter.

Further reading
 Boggi, Flavio and Gibbs, Robert: The Life and Career of Lippo di Dalmasio, a Bolognese Painter of the Late Fourteenth Century: With Illustrations and a Catalogue of His Works. The Edwin Mellen Press, 2010. .
 Boggi, Flavio and Gibbs, Robert: Lippo di Dalmasio. «Assai valente pittore». Bononia University Press, Bologna 2013. .

References

Sources
 
 

1360 births
1410 deaths
14th-century Italian painters
Italian male painters
15th-century Italian painters
Trecento painters
Painters from Bologna
Gothic painters